Polyetherimide (PEI) is an amorphous, amber-to-transparent thermoplastic with characteristics similar to the related plastic PEEK. When comparing PEI to PEEK, the former is cheaper but has lower impact strength and a tighter temperature range.

Due to its adhesive properties and chemical stability it became a popular bed material for FFF 3D printers.

Structure
It contains phthalimide and bisphenol A sub-units.

Properties
The glass transition temperature of PEI is 217 °C (422 °F). Its amorphous density at 25 °C is 1.27 g/cm3(.046 lb/in³). It is prone to stress cracking in chlorinated solvents. Polyetherimide is able to resist high temperatures while maintaining stable electrical properties over a wide range of frequencies. This high strength material offers excellent chemical resistance and ductile properties suitable for various applications, even those involving steam exposure.

References 

Plastics
Thermoplastics